Sigval Maartmann-Moe (May 23, 1921 – June 7, 2010) was a Norwegian film director and screenwriter.

Maartmann-Moe made his debut as a film director in 1951 with Dei svarte hestane, which he directed together with Hans Jacob Nilsen. This debut was followed by the documentary film Fakkelen til Oslo (1952), Savnet siden mandag (1955), Peter van Heeren (1957), I slik en natt (1958), and Vår egen tid (1959). Maartmann-Moe also wrote the screenplays for the last three.

Filmography

As director
 1951: Dei svarte hestane
 1952: Fakkelen til Oslo
 1955: Savnet siden mandag
 1957: Peter van Heeren
 1958: I slik en natt
 1959: Vår egen tid

As producer
 1950: To mistenkelige personer
 1951: Dei svarte hestane

As screenwriter
 1957: Peter van Heeren
 1958: I slik en natt
 1959: Vår egen tid

References

External links
 
 Sigval Maartmann-Moe at Filmfront
 Sigval Maartmann-Moe at the Swedish Film Database

1921 births
2010 deaths
Norwegian film directors
People from Oslo